Dan Gheorghiu was a Romanian fencer. He competed in three events at the 1928 Summer Olympics.

References

External links
 

Year of birth missing
Possibly living people
Romanian male fencers
Romanian épée fencers
Romanian foil fencers
Olympic fencers of Romania
Fencers at the 1928 Summer Olympics